Rullesteinøya is a small island between Langåra and Rugla in Tiholmane, part of Thousand Islands, an archipelago south of Edgeøya.

References

 Norwegian Polar Institute Place Names of Svalbard Database

Islands of Svalbard